Dhaam Dhoom is a 2008 Indian Tamil-language action thriller film based on the 1997 American film Red Corner. Written, filmed and directed by Jeeva shortly before his death and produced by Sunanda Murali Manohar, it stars Jayam Ravi, Kangana Ranaut, Lakshmi Rai and Jayaram.

The film revolves around a Tamil Indian doctor who, two weeks prior to his wedding, goes to Russia for a conference pertaining to his occupation, that of a doctor. While in Russia, he struggles to cope with the language because of the Russian reluctance to speak English, and eventually, due to the gruesome murder of a local woman, he gets imprisoned. How the doctor manages to get himself out of jail with the help of an Indian female lawyer, forms the crux of the story.

Dhaam Dhoom was released worldwide, after a long delay, on 29 August 2008. It was the posthumous film that cinematographer Jeeva undertook before his death which occurred halfway through the production. The film, released as a tribute to Jeeva, was completed by his assistant G.K.Manikandan, and his wife Anees, and was overseen by cinematographer P. C. Sriram.

Plot
Gautham Subramaniam (Jayam Ravi) is a doctor from an Indian family who lives in Chennai. Since his father (Nizhagal Ravi) and mother are doctors, he wanted to become a doctor. Gautham gets an opportunity from the Government of India to go to Russia to represent India in a week long medical conference, along with five other young doctors. Gautham is delighted to receive this offer and packs his bags to fly to Russia. Meanwhile, his beloved is introduced on the frame, which happens to be Shenba (Kangana Ranaut). She happens to be the same village girl in which Gautham's sister Sarasu (Anu Haasan) resides with her husband (Chetan). So, the two meet and fall in love but keep it a secret. However, Sarasu's husband finds their love when he sees Gautham pinching Shenba's waist so hard that she screams. Despite initial frictions between her father (Mahadevan) and uncle (Bose Venkat) with Gautham, they eventually agree to get the pair married. Gautham's parents agree to the marriage, and as a happy man, Gautham is ready to marry Shenba after his return to India from his Russia trip.

Finally, the journey to Russia happens. Gautham reaches Moscow and completes his immigration procedures. Incidentally, Gautham meets Anna (Maria Kozhevnikova), and unknowingly, Anna drops her jacket, which is seen by Gautham. He has no time to return the jacket and exits from the Moscow airport accompanied by his medical team. Gautham is flabbergasted by the roads and buildings of the city and is surprised to see the city of Moscow from his hotel view. Gautham learns that the only hiccup with Russians is that the people are ignorant about the English language and the whole conversation with them must be made in Russian.

Soon after, Gautham discovers Anna and takes the prospect to return her coat. The two get together well and part ways. Meanwhile, Gautham's medical conference takes place successfully, and in order to celebrate its success, the whole team heads to a nightclub. Gautham bumps into Anna in the nightclub, and the two have an enjoyable time in the club. Anna, due to heavy consumption of liquor, intoxicates, and Gautham has no other choice than to accompany her to her room. When the two reach Anna's apartment in, they settle down and sleep. Gautham is brutally dragged onto the floor by a Russian police officer the next day morning, and the reason is that Anna is murdered on her sofa.

Consequently, Gautham's situation changes; he gets abused, accused, and imprisoned by the Russian police. The language, people, and surroundings are totally new and confusing to him. Fortunately, Aarthi Chinnappa (Lakshmi Rai) is appointed as a defendant lawyer to Gautham. The Indian consulate sends Raghavan Nambiar (Jayaram) to Gautham's rescue. When Gautham tries to run away from the Russian police, he gets drowned in a lake, and Aarthi finds him at the shore. Aarthi kisses Gautham to rescue him, and she realises that she has fallen in love with Gautham, but she suppresses her feelings when she learns about Shenba. Gautham escapes from the police and is running around St. Petersburg with Aarthi, trying to figure out who murdered Anna and why he was caught up in the scandal. Whilst fleeing from the police, Gautham gets shot by the mob and manages to escape narrowly. After taking care of his wounds, Aarthi and Gautham decide to seek down those who misled them. The eventual villainous figure is revealed to be Raghavan.

Before a shoot out, Raghavan reveals that Anna was a drug trafficker from Chennai to Russia, and by dropping her coat, consisting of drugs, off at the airport, she manages to evade being caught. Soon after, Anna had changed her ways and was ready to tell the police about Raghavan's drug dealing, but before that happened, Raghavan, along with the mob, had her killed off. In the final scene, Raghavan is killed by the police, and Gautham is set free to reunite with Shenba for their wedding.

Cast

Production

Casting
The film was launched initially with Jayam Ravi paired opposite Genelia D'Souza, however she opted out of the project due to fully booked dates for her Telugu film, Dhee. After Genelia's removal from the project other leading actresses such as Asin and Mamta Mohandas were approached for a key role in the film, but they also rejected the offer, citing commitments to other projects. The film marked as Kangana Ranaut's debut in the Tamil film industry.

Reema Sen was chosen for a significant role in the film; however, 14 days after her confirmation, she pulled out of the project, citing differences with the director, Jeeva. The role offered to Reema Sen, that of a lawyer, had no songs and was the second heroine role. Reema Sen confirmed later to Kumudham magazine that she did not want to play the second lead in the film, and opted out of the project. On 19 February 2007, the producers confirmed the choice of Lakshmi Rai to essay the role dropped by Reema Sen. The project was also Lakshmi Rai's biggest film of her career till then, despite being the second female lead in the project. Jayaram was later selected to portray the villain in the film, appearing in such a role for the first time in his career.

As per Jeeva's previous films, Jeeva himself took charge of the cinematography, though, after his death, P. C. Sriram took charge. Although Jeeva had been reworking his final draft during filming, S. Ramakrishnan was brought in after his death to find a way to connect the climax with the previous draft to the final one; the two would not come together properly, otherwise.

Filming
The film started in January 2007 in India, with the initial shoot taking place in Chennai, consisting of Jayam Ravi surrounded by duplicate snow. The first schedule was shot in February 2007, in and around Pollachi, featuring the countryside backdrop, with scenes involving actors Jayam Ravi and Kangana Ranaut, among others. The film's crew originally had problems maintaining a visa to film in St. Petersburg, Russia, and decided to relocate the scenes to Prague in the Czech Republic; however, they eventually obtained visas to shoot in Russia. While shooting their schedule in Russia, on 26 June 2007, director Jeeva died after suffering cardiac arrest. The film was suspended indefinitely following the director's demise.

In early July 2007, it was announced that M. Raja, the elder brother of Jayam Ravi, would complete the project, but subsequently, veteran director P. C. Sriram signed to complete the project with Jeeva's widow Anees. Finally, Anees announced that the film would be completed by her and Jeeva's assistant G.K. Manikandan, whilst Sriram would overlook their efforts. Eventually, the team returned to Russia and canned the remaining scenes within 40 days.

Release
The satellite rights of the film were sold to Kalaignar TV.

Reception
The film opened to positive reception from audiences .

The film opened in Chennai strongly, with advance bookings full for the opening weekend at Inox and Sathyam Cinemas, while at Mayajaal, there were 22 shows daily of the film, leading to a successful opening of 92% full attendance. Rs. 49,29,778 was grossed on the first weekend in Chennai multiplexes, which had a total of 166 shows over three days. After the first week the film, maintained its place at top spot, despite the entry of Saroja, gaining Rs. 37,31,124, with a total attendance percentage in Chennai of 70%.

Overseas, in the United Kingdom box office, the film opened at number 22, earning £21,634 during the first weekend, after opening across four Cineworld screens. After the second week the cumulative gross increased to £37,050, retaining the number of screens, but slipping to 34th in the weekly rankings.

Soundtrack
The film has six songs composed by Harris Jayaraj with the lyrics primarily penned by Na. Muthukumar and Pa. Vijay. The audio of the film released worldwide on 19 March 2008, five months prior to the release. The soundtrack received praise from music critics, with Indiaglitz.com labelling the album as "delightful". Behindwoods gave the soundtrack 4 out 5 and mentioned that, "Clearly a master craftsman is at work here. A nice sophistication prevails through the whole album. No sound hurts your ears. If the film wins good reviews, the songs may play a big part in it."

References
.

External links
 

2008 films
Films shot in Moscow
Films shot in Saint Petersburg
2000s Tamil-language films
Films set in Russia
Indian action thriller films
Films scored by Harris Jayaraj
Films directed by Jeeva
2008 action thriller films
Films shot in Prague
Fictional portrayals of police departments in Russia